The 2008 Lamar Hunt U.S. Open Cup was the 95th edition of the USSF's annual national soccer championship, running from June through early September.

D.C. United won the final 2–1 over the Charleston Battery on September 3 at RFK Stadium in Washington, D.C. on a pair of goals from Brazilians Luciano Emilio and Fred. It was United's second Open Cup title.

The Battery were the first USL club in the final since the Rochester Rhinos won the cup in 1999.

The Cup schedule was shortened in 2008, ending in September instead of October, so as to avoid interfering with Major League Soccer's end-of-season playoff drive in the fall and the new CONCACAF Champions League.

The 13 US-based MLS clubs participated, although only 8 competed in the main tournament (Chicago Fire, Chivas USA, D.C. United, FC Dallas, Houston Dynamo, Kansas City Wizards, New England Revolution, New York Red Bulls).  Qualifying was similar to the 2007 tournament, with the top 3 teams from each conference in 2007 qualifying automatically, and the other 7 playing off during the early part of the 2008 season for the remaining 2 spots.

United Soccer Leagues had a separate qualifying plan for each tier.  The 8 US-based USL-1 teams qualified automatically (Puerto Rico has its own federation, thus the Puerto Rico Islanders are not eligible to participate in the Open Cup). 8 of the 9 US-based USL-2 teams qualified.  The defending USL-2 playoff champions, the Harrisburg City Islanders, and the 2007 regular-season champion Richmond Kickers qualified automatically.  The remaining 7 teams played off for 6 spots, based on early regular season results.  The PDL used selected early regular-season games for qualification.  The top two teams in the Eastern and Central conferences, and the top teams in the Mid-South, Southeast, Northwest, and Southwest divisions qualified.

The tournament was rounded out by 8 amateur USASA clubs (Adria, Arizona Sahuaros, Boston Olympiakos, Clearwater Galactics, Eagles, Hollywood United, New Stars, New York Pancyprian-Freedoms). USASA qualifying began in the fall of 2007.  Clubs from the NPSL enter the Cup through USASA qualifying.

Matchdays

Participating teams
The tournament consists of 40 teams, according to the following distribution:

*Includes 8 USL Premier Development League teams and 8 USASA regional qualifiers

Qualified Clubs

Tier 1: Major League Soccer (MLS)

Chicago Fire
Chivas USA
D.C. United
FC Dallas
Houston Dynamo
Kansas City Wizards
New England Revolution
New York Red Bulls

Tiers 2 – 4: United Soccer Leagues (USL) 

Tier 2 – First Division (USL-1)
Atlanta Silverbacks
Carolina RailHawks
Charleston Battery
Miami FC
Minnesota Thunder
Portland Timbers
Rochester Rhinos
Seattle Sounders

Tier 3 – Second Division (USL-2)
Charlotte Eagles
Cleveland City Stars
Crystal Palace Baltimore
Harrisburg City Islanders
Pittsburgh Riverhounds
Real Maryland Monarchs
Richmond Kickers
Western Mass Pioneers

Tier 4 – Premier Development League (PDL)
Austin Aztex U23
Bradenton Academics
Brooklyn Knights
Fredericksburg Gunners
Los Angeles Legends
Michigan Bucks
St. Louis Lions
Yakima Reds

Tier 5: United States Adult Soccer Association (USASA)

 RWB Adria
 Arizona Sahuaros
 Boston Olympiakos
 Clearwater Galactics
 A.A.C. Eagles
 Hollywood United
 New Stars
 New York Pancyprian-Freedoms

Open Cup bracket
Second Round winners advance to play one of 8 MLS clubs in 16-team knockout tournament
Home teams listed on top of bracket

Schedule
Note: Scorelines use the standard U.S. convention of placing the home team on the right-hand side of box scores.

First round

Second round

Third round

Quarterfinals

Semifinals

Final

Top scorers

External links
 TheCup.us – 2008 match reports and results

References

 
U.S. Open Cup
Lamar Hunt US Open Cup